Stageit is a web-based performance venue headquartered in Hollywood, California. It hosts paid performances by musical artists who perform live via webcam. The performances are not archived or duplicated for distribution.

Stageit currency 
In order to purchase tickets to Stageit performances, or to tip, users must first purchase Stageit's currency, called "notes."  One Stageit "note" is equivalent to ten cents. The performing artist decides how many notes a performance will cost.

Live performances 
Once a user purchases a ticket to a Stageit performance, they can join other audience members awaiting showtime in an online chat, which continues during the performance itself. Performances times and rates are set by artists. Performances on Stageit can last for up to thirty minutes. At the end of that time, artists are given the option to perform an additional twenty-minute encore set.

Notable artists 
Notable Stageit artists include:

 Jimmy Buffett
 Sara Bareilles
 Indigo Girls 
 Tom Morello 
 Jason Mraz 
 Bonnie Raitt 
 Blood on the Dance Floor 
 Art Smith 
 Jake Owen 
 John Oates 
 Hawthorne Heights
 Jordan Rudess 
 Matt Nathanson 
 Terry Bozzio 
 Lee DeWyze 
 Kottonmouth Kings 
 Better Than Ezra 
 Ryan Cabrera 
 David Banner 
 Jay Sean
 Kris Allen 
 Joshua Radin 
 Trey Songz 
 Rick Springfield 
 Plain White T's
 Debbie Gibson
 Korn
 Lisa Loeb
 Bowling For Soup 
 Howie D 
 Pomplamoose 
 Tiffany Alvord 
 Lacuna Coil 
 Mayday Parade 
 Less Than Jake 
 Stryper 
 The Ready Set 
 Bob Schneider 
 Tyler Ward 
 Tyler Hilton
 Kane
 Justin Furstenfeld

See also
Spreecast

References

External links 
 

American music websites